Hog Island is an island in the San Joaquin River, and is one of many islands which constitute the Sacramento–San Joaquin River Delta. It was used for agriculture in the early 20th century, but has now mostly become marsh or submerged land; it remains a spot for fishing, particularly halibut and striped bass.

Geography 
Hog Island is located in San Joaquin County, California, and is not managed by any reclamation district. Hog Island was separated from Spud Island to its southwest by the dredging of the Hog Island Cut; the two islands are in the San Joaquin River, at a point where McDonald Island lies to the west of the river and Rindge Tract to its east.

History 
The existence of a "Hog Island" in the Sacramento–San Joaquin River Delta is difficult to determine, since there are multiple islands with the same name. Nevertheless, references to a Hog Island in the Delta area can be found as early as 1880, and it first appears labeled on a 1910 USGS map surveyed in 1907 to 1908. However, the orientation of the islands was different on the 1910 map, in which they are separated by the Deadman Reach segment of the San Joaquin River (running north to south).

In June 1931, Hog and Spud Islands were mentioned in an engineering report on dredging in the Delta; the Hog Island Cut was being dredged to separate them, and levees were in the process of being constructed on both sides of the new cut with clamshell dredgers. From then onward, Hog Island appears on maps in its current shape. Over time, it began to subside; a 1939 USGS map shows it with a small slough in its interior on the northwest side, and a 1952 map shows it with substantial portions of its northern half as marshland. This agrees with the state of the island as shown in a 1978 USGS map.

The owners of Hog and Spud Islands spent many years attempting to open them to the public for recreational use; while plans were approved by the San Joaquin County Board of Supervisors in 2007, additional agencies required additional documents. In June 2011, the Modesto Bee reported that plans to build a family science camp were "moving forward with the blessing of the Army Corps of Engineers", and that new docks would be constructed later that summer.

Hog Island is known as a fishing spot in the Delta, where halibut and striped bass have been caught.

References

Islands of San Joaquin County, California
Islands of the Sacramento–San Joaquin River Delta
Islands of Northern California